Bakonybatrachus is an extinct genus of discoglossine discoglossid frog known from northwestern Hungary.

Description
Bakonybatrachus is known from the holotype MTM V 2010.283.1, a well preserved right ilium and from some referred isolated bones, including MTM V 2009.34.1, right maxilla, MTM V 2008.31.1, left angulospenial, and MTM V 2008.30.1, left scapula. All specimens were collected in Iharkút locality from the Csehbánya Formation in the Bakony Mountains, dating to the Santonian stage of the Late Cretaceous. The ilium suggest that Bakonybatrachus was a good jumper and swimmer.

Etymology
Bakonybatrachus was first named by Zoltán Szentesi and Márton Venczel in 2012 and the type species is Bakonybatrachus fedori. The generic name is derived from Bakony Mountains, in which the specimens were found, and Greek batrachus, "frog".

References

 
Archaeobatrachia
Prehistoric amphibian genera
Late Cretaceous amphibians
Fossil taxa described in 2012
Cretaceous amphibians of Europe